Rosco Allen (born May 5, 1993) is a Hungarian basketball player for Niigata Albirex BB of Japan’s B.League. He played college basketball for Stanford University.

Allen emigrated to the United States from Hungary at age 12 and played high school basketball at Bishop Gorman High School in Las Vegas. He chose Stanford and played for the Cardinal from 2012 to 2016. After earning first-team All-Pac-12 honors as a redshirt junior, Allen declared his eligibility for the 2016 NBA draft.

After going unselected in the draft, Allen played for the 2016 Golden State Warriors Summer League team and later signed with Obradoiro CAB in Spain.

Following the 2016–17 campaign, Allen signed with Iberostar Tenerife.

Allen was a member of the 2018 Boston Celtics Summer League team.

For the 2018–2019 season, Allen signed with Shimane Susanoo Magic of the Japanese B.League.

Allen was a member of the 2019 Los Angeles Lakers Summer League team.

In 2019–2020, Allen signed with Gunma Crane Thunders of the Japanese B.League. He averaged 23.8 points, 8.1 rebounds, and 4.6 assists per game. On June 12, 2020, Allen signed with Niigata Albirex BB.

Allen is a member of the men's Hungarian national basketball team.

Personal life
He was born in Budapest, Hungary to an American father and a Hungarian mother. He has been married to Angelica Allen since June 2019.

References

External links
Liga ACB profile
Stanford Cardinal bio

1993 births
Living people
Bishop Gorman High School alumni
CB Canarias players
Basketball players from Nevada
Gunma Crane Thunders players
Hungarian expatriate basketball people in Japan
Hungarian expatriate basketball people in Spain
Hungarian men's basketball players
Hungarian people of American descent
Liga ACB players
Niigata Albirex BB players
Obradoiro CAB players
Shimane Susanoo Magic players
Small forwards
Basketball players from Budapest
Stanford Cardinal men's basketball players
American people of Hungarian descent
American expatriate basketball people in Japan
American expatriate basketball people in Spain
American men's basketball players